Germariochaeta is a genus of flies in the family Tachinidae.

Species
 Germariochaeta clavata Villeneuve, 1937

References

Tachinidae